Igor Mirčeta (born 12 December 1986) is a Serbian footballer who last played for Strømmen in the Norwegian First Division as a midfielder .

Born in Šibenik, SR Croatia, back then part of SFR Yugoslavia, Mirčeta played with Serbian clubs FK Rad, FK Obilić and FK Radnički Pirot.  He also had a spell with FK BSK Borča after playing with Rad.  In the season 2005–06 he played with Austrian side Favoritner AC.  He joined Zalaegerszegi TE in 2008, where he played with the reserve team in the NB II.

He moved to Kalamata F.C. in the Greek Beta Ethniki in January 2009. He joined Kastoria F.C. in the Gamma Ethniki for the 2009–10 season. He scored his first league goal for Kastoria on 7 October 2009.

References

External sources
 

1986 births
Living people
Sportspeople from Šibenik
Serbs of Croatia
Serbian footballers
Serbian expatriate footballers
FK Rad players
FK BSK Borča players
FK Obilić players
FK Radnički Pirot players
Kalamata F.C. players
Kastoria F.C. players
Expatriate footballers in Greece
Association football defenders
Expatriate footballers in Norway
Expatriate footballers in Austria